In the 2013–14 season, MC El Eulma is competing in the Ligue 1 for the 6th season, as well as the Algerian Cup.  It is their 6th consecutive season in the top flight of Algerian football. They will be competing in Ligue 1, and the Algerian Cup.

Pre-season and friendlies

Competitions

Overview

{| class="wikitable" style="text-align: center"
|-
!rowspan=2|Competition
!colspan=8|Record
!rowspan=2|Started round
!rowspan=2|Final position / round
!rowspan=2|First match	
!rowspan=2|Last match
|-
!
!
!
!
!
!
!
!
|-
| Ligue 1

|  
| 4th
| 24 August 2013
| 22 May 2014
|-
| Algerian Cup

| colspan=2| Round of 64 
| colspan=2| 7 December 2013
|-
! Total

Ligue 1

League table

Results summary

Results by round

Matches

Algerian Cup

Squad information

Playing statistics

|-
! colspan=10 style=background:#dcdcdc; text-align:center| Goalkeepers

|-
! colspan=10 style=background:#dcdcdc; text-align:center| Defenders

|-
! colspan=10 style=background:#dcdcdc; text-align:center| Midfielders

|-
! colspan=10 style=background:#dcdcdc; text-align:center| Forwards

|-
! colspan=10 style=background:#dcdcdc; text-align:center| Players transferred out during the season

Goalscorers

Players

Transfers

In

Out

References

External links
 2013–14 MC El Eulma season at dzfoot.com 

MC El Eulma seasons
Algerian football clubs 2013–14 season